Karel Sabina (pen names include Arian Želinský and Leo Blass) (29 December 1813 – 8 November 1877) was a Czech writer and journalist.

Life 
Karel Sabina grew up in poverty as an extramarital child of a daughter of a sugar producing factory's director in the family of a bricklayer and a washerwoman. Sabina later claimed that he was an illegitimate son of a Polish noble. Studied philosophy and law, but did not graduate. In 1848 Sabina became one of the leaders of the Czech radical democrats, the founder of a secret radical political circle "Repeal" (the name inspired by Irish revolutionaries), a member of the National Committee and the Czech congress. Sabina published many articles (several of which were censored) to magazines during this period.

Imprisonment 
In 1849 he was arrested for taking part in the "May Coup" (a plan to make an uprising, inspired by Bakunin, then present in Prague) and in 1851 sentenced to death together with 24 other men; but these sentences were changed by the Emperor to 18 years in the Olomouc prison; in 1857 he was released, following the Emperor's general amnesty of May 8. He came back to Prague and lived as a freelance writer.

Allegations of betrayal 
In 1870 the newspaper Vaterland accused Sabina of being a police informant. Sabina successfully sued the newspaper for a libel.  In 1872, in an unofficial trial by a self-appointed jury of eight Czech intellectuals (including Jan Neruda and Vítězslav Hálek), Karel Sabina was found guilty of being an informant.  Sabina, unable to find exile abroad, was forced to live in hiding in Prague. For the rest of his life, Karel Sabina denied the accusations. The reasons of Sabina's alleged cooperation with the police are not quite clear; if it happened, it might have been a combination of disillusion with the failed revolution which resulted in his long imprisonment, constant police pressure afterwards and his extreme poverty. Being an outcast - his books were no longer sold, on posters (such as the one for the Prodaná nevěsta - whose libretto was seen by some people as Sabina's refutation of the accusations until Miroslav Ivanov's investigation in 1971 published in Ivanov's book Labyrint proved them incorrect) his name was replaced by his initials, and he risked physical attacks whenever he appeared on the streets. However, he continued to write under pen names, some of which are unknown today, thus greatly complicating the historians' effort to make Sabina's bibliography of articles complete.

Death 
Sabina died in poverty and scorn in 1877, general exhaustion being given as the cause of death.

Selected works 
As a journalist, he wrote mainly for Květy, Moravský Týdenník, Humorist, Lípa, Pražské noviny and Wčela (he was an editor in the last two, replacing Karel Havlíček Borovský in both of them).

Novels 
 Hrobník (1837), Sexton
 Blouznění (1857), Rapture
 Hedvika (1858), Hedwig
 Jen tři léta! (1860), Three years only!
 Na poušti (1863), In the desert
 Oživené hroby (1870), Enlivened Graves, inspired by his imprisonment, his best novel
 Morana čili Svět a jeho nicoty (1874), Morana or The World and its Nothingnesses

Plays 
 Černá růže, The Black Rose
 Inzerát, Advertisement
 Šašek Jiřího z Poděbrad, Jester of George of Poděbrady
 Maloměstské klepny, Smalltown Gossipmongers

Tales 
 Obrazy ze 14. a 15. věku (1844), Tales from the 14th and the 15th century
 Povídky, pověsti, obrazy a novely (1845), Stories, legends, tales and novellas

Librettos 
 Prodaná nevěsta, by Bedřich Smetana
 Braniboři v Čechách, by Bedřich Smetana
 Starý ženich, by Karel Bendl
 V studni, by Vilém Blodek

Others 
 Básně (1841), Poems
 Úvod povahopisný (1845), Introduction to a temperament - a very important book, being the very first study on Karel Hynek Mácha, who was Sabina's friend. This book recognised and illustrated Mácha's importance and genius.
 Duchovní komunismus (1861), Spiritual Communism - about everyone's right for education
 Dějiny literatury československé, The History of the Czechoslovakian Literature

Sabina in popular culture 
Karel Sabina is mentioned in several poems in prose by Ivan Wernisch.

References

External links

 M. Ivanov, Labyrint, Prague, 1971
 Info and photo, in Czech
 Info and photo, in Czech
 Database of Czech history, in Czech

1813 births
1877 deaths
Writers from Prague
Czech journalists
Czech philosophers
19th-century Czech poets
Czech male poets
Czech male dramatists and playwrights
Czech opera librettists
19th-century journalists
Male journalists
19th-century Czech dramatists and playwrights
19th-century male writers